Burtunay is a rural locality (a selo) in Kazbekovsky District, Republic of Dagestan, Russia. The population was 4,035 as of 2010. There are 18 streets.

Nationalities 
Avars live there.

Famous residents 
 Saygidpasha Umakhanov (statesman)
 Gadzhi Makhachev (statesman, Doctor of Law, Professor, Deputy of the State Duma of the Russian Federation)
 Adam Amirilayev (Deputy of the State Duma of the Russian Federation)

Geography
Burtunay is located 13 km south of Dylym (the district's administrative centre) by road. Almak and Guni are the nearest rural localities.

References 

Rural localities in Kazbekovsky District